Jean-Baptiste D'Astous (March 19, 1904 – July 26, 1998) was a Canadian politician. He served in the Legislative Assembly of New Brunswick as member of the Liberal party from 1945 to 1952.

References

1904 births
1998 deaths
New Brunswick Liberal Association MLAs